Socialist Democracy (DS) was a Spanish political party of socialist ideology founded in 1990 by Ricardo García Damborenea, the ex-leader of the Spanish Socialist Workers' Party (PSOE) in the province of Biscay.

History
The party was formed after García Damborenea was expelled from the PSOE for trying to create an "internal current" and "[parallel] structure" of the same name. In 1992 the party joined the Coalition for a New Socialist Party, which failed to gain any representation at the national or regional level.

Elections
 Andalusian regional election, 1990: 14,495 votes (0.53%).
 Basque regional election, 1990: 5.023 votos (0.49%).
 Valencian regional election, 1991: 5.207 votos (0.26%).
 Local elections, 1991: 8.747 votos (0.05%). 4 municipal councillors.

References

1990 establishments in Spain
Defunct socialist parties in Spain
Political parties established in 1990